Manchester Cumberland Presbyterian Church is a historic Cumberland Presbyterian congregation in Manchester, Tennessee. Its former church building, also known as the Church Street Theatre, is listed on the National Register of Historic Places.

The church was organized in 1854. Its first church was a two-story wooden frame building that was shared with local Masons, who held the meetings upstairs from the church.

The church's second building, built in 1890, is a brick building of Gothic Revival design located at the corner of Church and W. High Streets in Manchester. In 1961, the church vacated this building when it moved to its present location on the corner of McArthur and Coffee Streets. The 1890 church building was added to the National Register in 1992, and was delisted in 2021.

References

External links
 Church website

Presbyterian churches in Tennessee
Churches on the National Register of Historic Places in Tennessee
Gothic Revival church buildings in Tennessee
Churches completed in 1890
19th-century Presbyterian church buildings in the United States
Buildings and structures in Coffee County, Tennessee
Cumberland Presbyterian Church
National Register of Historic Places in Coffee County, Tennessee
Manchester, Tennessee